Simon Douglas Fry (born 29 July 1966) is an Australian cricket umpire. In April 2020, Fry announced his retirement from elite umpiring.

Umpiring career
Fry served as an international umpire in ODIs for the first time in a match between Australia and England at Adelaide on 26 January 2011. He stood in his first T20I in a match between Australia and England at Adelaide on 12 January 2011.

He was selected as one of the twenty umpires to stand in matches during the 2015 Cricket World Cup, where was an on-field umpire in three group stage matches. On 22 October 2015 he made his debut as an umpire in a Test match, standing in the game between Sri Lanka and the West Indies at Colombo (PSS).

He stood in 100 First-class, 130 List A and 93 T20 matches.

See also
 List of Test cricket umpires
 List of One Day International cricket umpires
 List of Twenty20 International cricket umpires

References

Living people
1966 births
Sportspeople from Adelaide
Australian Test cricket umpires
Australian One Day International cricket umpires
Australian Twenty20 International cricket umpires
Australian cricket umpires